The Weapons of Youth (German: Die Waffen der Jugend) is a 1913 German silent film directed by Friedrich Müller and starring Gertrud Gräbner, Curt Maler and Hans Staufen.

The screenplay was written by the Robert Wiene his first known involvement with films. Wiene later went on to become a leading film director. Some reports suggest that Wiene may have served as a co-director on the film. The film is now a lost film, and virtually nothing is known of its plot or genre.

Cast
 Gertrud Gräbner   
 Curt Maler   
 Hans Staufen   
 Conrad Wiene

References

Bibliography
 Jung, Uli & Schatzberg, Walter. Beyond Caligari: The Films of Robert Wiene. Berghahn Books, 1999.

External links

1913 films
Films of the German Empire
German silent short films
Lost German films
German black-and-white films
1910s German films